Trofimenko or Trofymenko (Трофименко) is a Ukrainian surname. Notable people with the surname include:

 Mykola Trofymenko (born 1985), Ukrainian political scientist
 Sergei Trofimenko (1899–1953), Soviet general
 Swiatoslaw Trofimenko, American chemist
 Vitali Trofimenko (born 1970), Russian footballer
 Vladimir Trofimenko (born 1953), Russian pole vaulter
 Yelena Trofimenko (born 1964), Belarusian film director

See also
 

Ukrainian-language surnames